Louth was a county constituency in Lincolnshire which returned one Member of Parliament (MP)  to the House of Commons of the Parliament of the United Kingdom from 1885 until it was abolished for the 1983 general election.

It should not be confused with the former Irish constituency of County Louth (UK Parliament constituency). Between 1885 and 1918, its formal name was The East Lindsey (or Louth) Division of Lincolnshire, and it was sometimes referred to simply as East Lindsey.

Boundaries 
1885–1918: The Sessional Divisions of Louth, Market Rasen, and Wragby, and parts of the Sessional Divisions of Alford, Grimsby, and Horncastle.

1918–1950: The Borough of Louth, the Urban Districts of Mablethorpe and Market Rasen, and the Rural Districts of Caistor, Grimsby, and Louth.

1950–1974: The Boroughs of Louth and Cleethorpes, and the Rural Districts of Grimsby and Louth.

1974–1983: As prior but with redrawn boundaries.

Members of Parliament

Election results

Elections in the 1880s

Elections in the 1890s

Elections in the 1900s

Elections in the 1910s

General Election 1914–15

A General Election was due to take place by the end of 1915. By the autumn of 1914, the following candidates had been adopted to contest that election. Due to the outbreak of war, the election never took place.
Liberal: Timothy Davies
Unionist: Langton Brackenbury

Elections in the 1920s

endorsed by Coalition Government

Elections in the 1930s

Elections in the 1940s
General Election 1939–40

A General Election was due to take place by the spring of 1940. By the autumn of 1939, the following candidates had been adopted to contest that election. Due to the outbreak of war, the election never took place.
Conservative: Arthur Heneage
Liberal: Alan Pryce-Jones
Labour: Jack H Franklin

Elections in the 1950s

Elections in the 1960s

Elections in the 1970s

See also 
 1920 Louth by-election
 1921 Louth by-election
 1969 Louth by-election

References 

 
 The Constitutional Year Book for 1913 (London: National Union of Conservative and Unionist Associations, 1913)

Parliamentary constituencies in Lincolnshire (historic)
Constituencies of the Parliament of the United Kingdom established in 1885
Constituencies of the Parliament of the United Kingdom disestablished in 1983
Louth, Lincolnshire